General elections were held in the Solomon Islands for the first time on 7 April 1965.

Background
In 1960 a Legislative Council was established composed entirely of appointed members. Of the 21, only six were Solomon Islanders. Following a White Paper in 1963, the British Privy Council approved a new constitution for the British Solomon Islands on 25 September 1964, replacing the 1960 constitution. On 4 November the British Solomon Islands Order was passed by the Parliament of the United Kingdom, bringing into force section 31, which related to the holding of elections prior to the rest of the constitution coming into effect on 1 February 1965.

Electoral system
The new constitution provided for a 22-seat Legislative Council, consisting of the Governor, eleven  civil servants, two members appointed by the High Commissioner and eight elected members. Of the elected members, three represented Malaita, two represented Central District, whilst Eastern District, Western District and Honiara had one member each.

Although the Honiara representative was directly elected by universal suffrage (with the voting age set at 21), the remaining seven members were elected by electoral colleges. The colleges were composed of elected local councillors, with one member per 500 residents of the constituency. Where the number of elected councillors was insufficient, councillors could elect further members by secret ballot. The colleges then elected the members of the Legislative Council; preliminary ballots were used to eliminate the lowest-scoring candidate until only two remained, at which point the candidate with a majority of votes was elected.

Campaign
Two candidates – Eric Lawson and C.H. Cheng – contested the Honiara seat, with 44 candidates contesting the indirectly-elected seats.

Around 1,100 people registered to vote in Honiara.

Results
Eric Lawson was elected in Honiara. The sole female candidate, Lilly Ogatina, was elected in Central Solomons. Leonard Alufurai and James Michael Wall were appointed as unofficial members.

References

Solomon Islands
1965 in the Solomon Islands
Elections in the Solomon Islands
Legislative Council of the Solomon Islands
April 1965 events in Oceania
Election and referendum articles with incomplete results